System 4 or System IV may refer to:
 Acorn System 4, the early minicomputer
 The fourth release of Classic Mac OS
 International Computers Limited#English Electric LEO Marconi (EELM), also known as ICL System 4
 Not-released Unix system between UNIX System III and UNIX System V
 STS-4 (Space Transportation System-4), the Space Shuttle mission

See also
 IBM System/4 Pi